is a railway station in the city of Shiroishi, Miyagi Prefecture, Japan, operated by East Japan Railway Company (JR East).

Lines

Station layout
The station has a single side platform and an island platform connected to the station building by a footbridge. The station is unattended.

Platforms

History
Kita-Shirakawa Station opened on December 19, 1911. The station was absorbed into the JR East network upon the privatization of the Japanese National Railways (JNR) on April 1, 1987.

Surrounding area
 Kita-Shirakawa Post Office
Shiroishi River

See also
 List of Railway Stations in Japan

External links

  

Railway stations in Miyagi Prefecture
Tōhoku Main Line
Railway stations in Japan opened in 1911
Shiroishi, Miyagi